Clifford Wilson Simpson (April 4, 1923 – May 30, 1987) was a Canadian ice hockey player who played six regular season games in the National Hockey League with the Detroit Red Wings during the 1946–47 season and two playoff games with Detroit: one in 1947 and one in 1948. The rest of his career, which lasted from 1942 to 1952, was spent in the minor leagues. Simpson was born in Toronto, Ontario.

Career statistics

Regular season and playoffs

External links
 

1923 births
1987 deaths
Brantford Lions players
Canadian expatriates in the United States
Canadian ice hockey centres
Detroit Red Wings players
Indianapolis Capitals players
Ontario Hockey Association Senior A League (1890–1979) players
St. Louis Flyers players
Ice hockey people from Toronto
Toronto Young Rangers players